Sir William Grey  (1818 – 15 May 1878) was an English administrator who worked with the East India Company in India and served as lieutenant-governor of Bengal from 1867 when he succeeded Sir Cecil Beadon and later as governor of Jamaica.

Grey was the fourth son of Edward Grey, bishop of Hereford while his mother was the daughter of James Croft of Greenham Lodge, near Newbury, Berkshire. Grey studied at Christ Church, Oxford, but did not complete studies and joined the war office as a clerk. Nominated to work in the Bengal civil service he entered Haileybury College in January 1839 and passed out in July 1840. During his first term, he was rusticated for late night parties in his room but made up for it in later terms. He went to Bengal in 1840 and worked for a while in various offices before becoming a private secretary to Sir Herbert Maddock in 1845. In 1851 he became secretary of the Bank of Bengal. He became a secretary to the government of Bengal in 1854. He went on furlough to England in January 1857 but was forced back by the rebellion in that year. He was appointed director general of the post office in 1859 after holding various temporary offices. In 1861 he became a member of the council of the governor-general of Bengal. In 1867 he became lieutenant-governor of Bengal.

As an administrator, he opposed excessive centralization and helped decentralise the postal department. He opposed the application of income-tax rules in India. He often held opposing views to those of the governor-general Sir John Lawrence. He felt that the use of land cess to support education was unjust to the landholders. His position did not find favour with Lord Mayo. He was made Knight Commander of The Most Exalted Order of the Star of India in the 1870 Birthday Honours. He retired in 1871 and returned to England. In 1874 he accepted a position of governor in Jamaica.

He died at Torquay on 15 May 1878. He was married first in 1845 to Margaret née Jackson and after her death in 1862 he married again in 1865 to Georgina née Plowden. He had five sons and four daughters.

References

1818 births
1878 deaths
Lieutenant-governors of Bengal
Knights Commander of the Order of the Star of India